The AN/PVS-17 Miniature Night Sight (MNS) is a compact, lightweight and high performance night vision weapon sight in wide use by the United States Special Forces and United States Marine Corps (USMC).  The AN/PVS-17 is a Generation III Night Vision Device and uses the OMNI IV MX 10160 3rd generation image intensifier tube and can also be used as a handheld observation device.  The designation AN/PVS translates to Army/Navy Portable Visual Search, according to Joint Electronics Type Designation System guidelines.

According to the Armed Forces History Museum, the PVS-17 intensifies images for night vision sight and fits easily on a variety of weapons.  The PVS-17 operates submerged in depths up to 66 ft.

Variants 
There are generally 2 variants of AN/PVS 17s; the A/B variant and the C variant.  In general, the 17A/B is intended to be mounted on rifles like the M16/M4, and the 17C is mounted on support weapons like 5.56mm M249 Squad Automatic Weapons (SAW) and 7.62mm M240B/G General Purpose Machine Guns.

History
PVS-17s were regarded as one of the successful systems that reached U.S. troops just before the Iraq War's Operation Iraqi Freedom (OIF) began.  According to testimony by Lieutenant General Edward Hanlon Jr. before the House Armed Services Committee, Subcommittee on Tactical Air and Land Force on April 1, 2004, the Marine Corps fielded many new items of equipment and weapon systems just prior to or during the deployment of 1st Marine Expeditionary Force for OIF.  Some were in response to requests from the deploying forces, and others were advance-fielded by Marine Corps Systems Command (MCSC).  Most new items were positively received and were combat multipliers.  Of particular significance were: The Dragon Eye unmanned aerial vehicle; the Blue Force Tracker (BFT) systems; Combat Identification (CID) Panels/ Thermal Identification Panels; and Personal Role Radios (PRR).  All of these initiatives provide enhanced unit situational awareness, from squad through division.  Additionally, night vision devices such  as the  PVS-17 enhanced lethality and situational awareness in reduced visibility.

See also 
 SOPMOD
 AN/PSQ-20
 AN/PVS-14

References 

Armoured fighting vehicle vision and sighting equipment
Military electronics of the United States
Night vision devices